The Scandinavian , plural , is a classical music art song equivalent to the German , French  or Russian romance.

Term
The term  is Swedish, plural , and in Swedish (:sv:Romans (musik)) applies also to the German .

References

Danish music
Norwegian music
Swedish music
Finnish music
Song forms